Damasichthon (Ancient Greek: Δαμασίχθων) is a name that refers to the following figures in Greek mythology and legendary history:

Damasichthon, one of the Niobids.
Damasichthon (King of Thebes), grandson of Peneleos and successor to Autesion.
Damasichthon, son of King Codrus

Notes

References 

 Pausanias, Description of Greece with an English Translation by W.H.S. Jones, Litt.D., and H.A. Ormerod, M.A., in 4 Volumes. Cambridge, MA, Harvard University Press; London, William Heinemann Ltd. 1918. . Online version at the Perseus Digital Library
 Pausanias, Graeciae Descriptio. 3 vols. Leipzig, Teubner. 1903.  Greek text available at the Perseus Digital Library.
 Publius Ovidius Naso, Metamorphoses translated by Brookes More (1859-1942). Boston, Cornhill Publishing Co. 1922. Online version at the Perseus Digital Library.
 Publius Ovidius Naso, Metamorphoses. Hugo Magnus. Gotha (Germany). Friedr. Andr. Perthes. 1892. Latin text available at the Perseus Digital Library.

Princes in Greek mythology
Niobids
Attican characters in Greek mythology
Theban characters in Greek mythology
Deeds of Apollo
Deeds of Artemis